R. Kolanthaivelu (1935 – unknown ) was an Indian politician and former Member of Parliament elected from Tamil Nadu. He was elected to the Lok Sabha as an Anna Dravida Munnetra Kazhagam candidate from Tiruchengode constituency in 1977 election. He went to Loyala College, Presidency College, Pachaiyappa's College for his higher education. He married Rathinam in 1973. He was a Lawyer and agriculturist by profession.

References 

1935 births
All India Anna Dravida Munnetra Kazhagam politicians
India MPs 1977–1979
People from Namakkal district
Year of death missing